Margaret De Wolfe Wycherly (born Margaret De Wolfe, 26 October 1881 – 6 June 1956) was an English stage and film actress. She spent many years in the United States and is best remembered for her Broadway roles and Hollywood character parts. On screen she played mother to Gary Cooper (Sergeant York) and James Cagney (White Heat).

Early life
Wycherly was born in London, England of her Canadian father and American mother, Dr. and Mrs. J. L. De Wolfe. She was married to writer Bayard Veiller (1869–1943) in 1901. They had a son, Anthony Veiller (1903–1965), who also became a writer. She and Veiller divorced in 1922.

Career

She was primarily a stage actress, appearing in one silent film. In 1929, she appeared in her second film, but first talkie, The Thirteenth Chair, based on the 1916 play by her husband in which she had starred. The film was directed by Tod Browning and was in the genre of mystery-old house melodrama. Twelve years later, Wycherley appeared in Sergeant York in 1941. She was nominated for the Academy Award for Best Supporting Actress for the role of Mother York, though perhaps her best remembered screen role was as Ma Jarrett, the mother of the psychopathic gangster Cody Jarrett, in White Heat (1949), which starred James Cagney.

Wycherly starred in several popular Broadway plays, including Tobacco Road, Liliom, Six Characters in Search of an Author and The Thirteenth Chair (which role she reprised in the film of the same name). Her other films include Keeper of the Flame, The Yearling, Random Harvest, Forever Amber, The Man with a Cloak and Johnny Angel starring George Raft.

She portrayed Mrs. Brown, Claudia's mother, in the American television series Claudia (1952).

Death
Wycherly died on 6 June 1956 at St. Clare's Hospital in New York City, at the age of 74. She was buried at the St Mary Churchyard, Bepton, Chichester District, West Sussex, England.

Complete filmography
The Fight (1915) – Jane Thomas
The Thirteenth Chair (1929) – Madame Rosalie La Grange
Midnight (1934) – Mrs. Weldon
Wanderlust (1938, Short)
Victory (1940) – Mrs. Schomberg
Sergeant York (1941) – Mother York
Crossroads (1942) – Madame Pelletier
Random Harvest (1942) – Mrs. Deventer
Keeper of the Flame (1943) – Mrs. Forrest
Assignment in Brittany (1943) – Mme. Henriette Corlay
The Moon Is Down (1943) – Mme. Sarah Orden
Hangmen Also Die! (1943) – Ludmilla Novotny
Experiment Perilous (1944) – Maggie
Johnny Angel (1945) – Miss Drumm
The Yearling (1946) – Ma Forrester
Something in the Wind (1947) – Grandma Read
Forever Amber (1947) – Mrs. Spong
The Loves of Carmen (1948) – Old Crone
White Heat (1949) – Ma Jarrett
The Man with a Cloak (1951) – Emma Flynn
That Man from Tangier (1953) – Mrs. Sanders
The President's Lady (1953) – Mrs. Robards

References

External links

Margaret Wycherly 1914 portrait at University of Louisville Macauley's Theatre collection
Margaret Wycherly photo gallery NYP Library
portrait gallery(Univ. of Washington/Sayre collection)

1881 births
1956 deaths
English silent film actresses
English stage actresses
Actresses from London
20th-century English actresses
British expatriate actresses in the United States
English people of American descent
English people of Canadian descent